T cell receptor alpha joining 56 is a protein that in humans is encoded by the TRAJ56 gene.

References

Further reading 

Proteins